My Papa Pi is a Philippine sitcom television series starring Piolo Pascual, Pepe Herrera, and Pia Wurtzbach. It premiered on television via Kapamilya Channel, A2Z, and worldwide via The Filipino Channel. Directed by Cathy Garcia-Molina, it was first broadcast from March 19 to June 18, 2022, replacing Home Sweetie Home, and was replaced by the second season of Idol Philippines.

Premise 
In the fictional Barangay Mapag-asa, twin brothers Pipoy and Popoy live different lives despite living in the same house. Pipoy is a single father looking for a better life for his daughter, while Popoy is a successful entrepreneur who owns One More Tumbong that sells tumbong, a special pork intestine soup. Tere, the neighbor of the twins, is a kind-hearted woman whom Popoy aims to earn her heart for him, but has feelings for Pipoy.

Early on, Popoy suddenly dies in an accident, but only to return to Barangay Mapag-asa as a ghost only Pipoy could see and hear. Knowing he can take over his twin brother, Popoy finds the perfect timing to pursue the clueless Tere.

Cast and characters 
Piolo Pascual as Policarpio "Pipoy" Papa III
Pia Wurtzbach as Tere
Pepe Herrera as Popoy
Joross Gamboa as Boy Tinga
Katya Santos as Delia
Alora Sasam as Chrissie
Frenchie Dy as Marichu
Haiza Madrid as Analyn
Hyubs Azarcon as Chip
Daisy "Madam Inutz" Lopez as Madam Bebe
Daniela Stranner as Charmaine
Anthony Jennings as Harvee
Quincy Villanueva as Sheena
Allyson McBride as Mikay

Episodes
 iWantTFC shows one episode first in advance before its television broadcast.

Production
My Papa Pi is produced under Star Creatives, a television production arm of Star Cinema, with Cathy Garcia-Molina as its director.

Casting
The casting of Piolo Pascual and Pia Wurtzbach served as their reunion project after Wurtzbach, then credited as Pia Romero, had a brief appearance in the 2005 sitcom Bora. ABS-CBN initially selected Angelica Panganiban for the role of Tere, but instead gave the role to Wurtzbach. Star Creatives did not give any statement to why they replaced Panganiban with Wurtzbach. The show marks the teleserye acting debut for Anthony Jennings who previously starred in the 2021 movie Love At First Stream, and the acting debut for Madam Inutz who had previously took part as a celebrity housemate in Pinoy Big Brother: Kumunity Season 10.

References

External links 
 

ABS-CBN original programming
Philippine comedy television series
Philippine television sitcoms
2022 Philippine television series debuts
2022 Philippine television series endings
Television series by Star Creatives
Television shows set in the Philippines
Filipino-language television shows